The Twelve Tribes of Israel were the traditional kin groups among the ancient Israelites. 

Twelve Tribes may also refer to:

 Twelve Tribes of Ishmael, descendants of Ishmael from Book of Genesis
 Twelve noble tribes of Croatia, a late medieval nobility institution
 Twelve Tribes of Israel (Rastafari), a Rastafari group formed in 1968
 Twelve Tribes communities, a Christian movement started in 1972
 Twelve Circassian tribes, an historical self-division of the Circassian People.

Other
 Twelve Tribes (album), an album by Richard Souther
 Twelve Tribes (band), an American metalcore band

See also
 Twelve Colonies, fictional human "tribes" in Battlestar Galactica television series